The women's welterweight (67 kilograms) event at the 2018 Asian Games took place on 20 August 2018 at Jakarta Convention Center Plenary Hall, Jakarta, Indonesia.

A total of sixteen competitors from sixteen countries competed in this event, limited to fighters whose body weight was less than 67 kilograms. 

Julyana Al-Sadeq of Jordan won the gold medal to become the first female gold medalists from her country in the history of the Asian Games. She beat Kim Jan-di of South Korea 5–1 in the final.

Top seed Zhang Mengyu from China and Nigora Tursunkulova from Uzbekistan both lost in the semifinal, finished third and won the bronze medal together.

Schedule
All times are Western Indonesia Time (UTC+07:00)

Results 
Legend
R — Won by referee stop contest

References

External links
Official website

Taekwondo at the 2018 Asian Games